Morud is a town located on the island of Funen in south-central Denmark, in Nordfyn Municipality. It is the fourth largest town in Nordfyn Municipality after Otterup, Bogense and Søndersø.

Notable people
 Dan Jørgensen (born 1975), Danish politician.
 Lars Simonsen (born 1963), Danish actor.

References 

Cities and towns in the Region of Southern Denmark
Nordfyn Municipality